Temporarily Yours is an American sitcom that aired on CBS for six episodes in 1997.

Plot
Deb DeAngelo (Debi Mazar), a young woman is desperate for a luxurious, cheaply priced New York City apartment. She lies to the landlady about having a job with a temp agency and then hurries to the agency to beg for work before the landlady calls and discovers the lie. The agency is run by Joan (Joanna Gleason), an uptight businesswoman. Joan reluctantly takes on Deb as an employee but sends her out on strange assignments.

In the pilot episode, she is sent to work as a makeup artist at a mortuary. The following episodes generally revolved around Deb's various temporary assignments and how they affected her personal life.

Cast
 Debi Mazar as Deb DeAngelo
 Joanna Gleason as Joan Silver
 Seth Green as David Silver
 Saverio Guerra as Caesar Santos
 Nancy Cassaro as Anne Marie

Reception
The series was heavily derided by critics and had low viewership and was canceled after six episodes.  In Entertainment Weekly, Bruce Fretts wrote: 
The cast renders this limp material watchable. Mazar’s outer-borough chumminess contrasts well with Gleason’s WASPy chilliness. While it’s no gem, the show fits better with The Nanny than did Rhea Perlman’s tarnished Pearl. But if Mazar wants more than a temporary presence on CBS, she might want to call in a few temps herself — to replace the show’s writers.

Episodes

References

External links

1990s American sitcoms
1997 American television series debuts
1997 American television series endings
CBS original programming
Television shows set in New York City
Television series created by Michael Patrick King
Television series by 20th Century Fox Television